Strachy Na Lachy (properly Międzymiastówka Muzykująca Strachy Na Lachy) is a Polish rock band (originally known as Grabaż + Ktoś Tam Jeszcze before becoming Grabaż i Strachy Na Lachy).

Strachy Na Lachy (Empty Threats) is led by Krzysztof "Grabaż" Grabowski and Andrzej "Kozak" Kozakiewicz, who also play in the punk group Pidżama Porno. They formed Strachy Na Lachy in order to play softer music, such as rock ballads. Their first album, Strachy Na Lachy, was released in December 2003, and a second, Piła Tango, the title track of which became their first hit, was released at the end of 2005.

They often play in the Piwnica 21 Club in Poznań.

The artwork for the Piła Tango album is by the Armenian artist Vahan Bego. In 2007 Strachy na Lachy recorded a tribute album to Jacek Kaczmarski, and a year later they released their tribute to the underground Polish communist music culture, the album Zakazane Piosenki (Forbidden songs).

Members
 Krzysztof "Grabaż" Grabowski - vocals and guitar
 Andrzej "Kozak" Kozakiewicz - guitar and vocals
 Rafał "Kuzyn" Piotrkowiak - drums
 Longin "Lo" Bartkowiak - bass and vocals
 Mariusz "Maniek" Nalepa - almost everything
 Tomasz "Tom Horn" Rożek - keyboards

Discography

Studio albums

Compilation albums

Cover albums

Video albums

References

External links
 Strachy na Lachy official site
 Band history

Polish rock music groups
Musical groups established in 2003